Smith Child may refer to:

 Smith Child (Royal Navy officer), Royal Navy admiral and grandfather of the 1st Baronet
 Sir Smith Child, 1st Baronet (1808–1896), English politician, MP for Staffordshire North 1851–1859 and Staffordshire West 1868–1874
 Sir Smith Child, 2nd Baronet (1880–1958), MP for Stone 1918–1922

See also
Child (surname)